This is a list of notable mushroom dishes and foods, comprising foodstuffs prepared using mushrooms as a primary ingredient.

Edible mushrooms have variety of benefits when consumed. They have essential nutrients we need for a healthy life, including protein, vitamins B, C and D, and selenium, which helps prevent cancer. They are a good source of iron, copper, riboflavin, niacin and contain dietary fiber. One portobello mushroom can contain more potassium than a banana.

In many cultures, mushroom picking is an important tradition and can be a substantial source of income. In the Pacific Northwest of the United States, it is estimated that, in some situations, the value of the yearly mushroom harvest in a forest can equal the value of lumber it can produce. According to the “Menus of Change” initiative of The Culinary Institute of America and the Harvard School of Public Health Department of Nutrition, pairing the evidence for health- and sustainability-linked food choices with flavor, other culinary, and demographic trends and plausible business scenarios allows flavor-rich, largely plant-based food and menu choices to emerge. Mushrooms, with their unique sensory and culinary properties, may help Americans move toward healthier, plant-based choices. Of particular interest are the high amounts of both glutamates (not as monosodium glutamate) and ribonucleotides in A. bisporus. Glutamate and certain 5′-ribonucleotides are taste-active chemicals responsible for umami flavours. Calcium diglutamate, in particular, was shown to improve the flavor of low-sodium products.

Mushroom dishes 

 Ciulama – mainly found in Romanian and Moldovan cuisine, this dish is prepared with poultry or mushrooms
Coulibiac with mushrooms - Russian pirog filled with mushrooms
 Cream of mushroom soup – simple cream soup prepared using mushrooms
 Diri ak djon djon – Haitian Creole for rice with mushrooms, it is a native dish of Haiti
 Duxelles – finely chopped (minced) mixture of mushrooms or mushroom stems, onions, shallots, and herbs sautéed in butter, and reduced to a paste.
Marinated mushrooms – chopped mushrooms marinated with spices, popular in Russian cuisine under brands Uniservis and Mikado 
Mushroom broth – Soup base made from mushrooms instead of animals or plants, used in vegan ramen
Mushroom burger –  burgers made with mushrooms as a meat substitute, can be a thick slice of a Portabello or a patty made of minced mushrooms
Mushroom gravy – mushroom-based sauce
 Mushroom ketchup – style of ketchup that is prepared with mushrooms as its primary ingredient. Originally, ketchup in the United Kingdom was prepared with mushrooms, instead of tomato, the main ingredient in contemporary preparations of ketchup.
 Mushroom sauce – often cream-based
 Oysters en brochette – variation of the dish whereby it is prepared with mushrooms on the skewers, rather than bacon, and also with both mushrooms, bacon, chunks of tomato, and/or cubes of cooked ham.
 Sautéed mushrooms – flavorful dish prepared by sautéing mushrooms in butter or oil
 Selsko meso – Macedonian and Balkan pork and mushroom dish
 Stuffed mushrooms – myriad fillings are used in this baked dish
 Veal Orloff – consists of a braised loin of veal, thinly sliced, filled with a thin layer of pureed mushrooms and onions between each slice
 Wild mushroom biryani – The Thar desert traditional Mushroom Biryani is one of the delicious dishes of desert organic foods that may be enjoyed on different occasions

Gallery

See also

 List of Chinese mushrooms and fungi
 List of onion dishes
 List of vegetable dishes

References
More references:

Alexander, S., Pilz, D., WEBER, N. et al. Mushrooms, Trees, and Money: Value Estimates of Commercial Mushrooms and Timber in the Pacific Northwest.                    Environmental Management 30, 129–141 (2002). https://doi.org/10.1007/s00267-002-2610-1
Ball, P., Woodward, D., Beard, T. et al. Calcium diglutamate improves taste characteristics of lower-salt soup. Eur J Clin Nutr 56, 519–523 (2002). https://doi.org/10.1038/sj.ejcn.1601343
Abu Janus, First Published, World in Eyes, WiE, 2020

 
Mushroom